Stigmatophora palmata is a moth of the subfamily Arctiinae first described by Frederic Moore in 1878. It is found in the north-western Himalayas and Assam.

References

Lithosiini
Moths of Asia